Arab Hassan Kabir (also spelled 'Arab Hasan Kebir) is a village in northern Syria, administratively part of the Aleppo Governorate, located northeast of Aleppo. Nearby localities include Manbij to the southeast and Arab Hassan Saghir to the north. In the 2004 census, it had a population of 2,763.

References

Populated places in Manbij District